Notepad++ is a free and open-source text and source code editor for use with Microsoft Windows. It supports tabbed editing, which allows working with multiple open files in a single window. The product's name comes from the C postfix increment operator.

Notepad++ is distributed as free software. At first, the project was hosted on SourceForge.net, from where it was downloaded over 28 million times and twice won the SourceForge Community Choice Award for Best Developer Tool. Notepad++ uses the Scintilla editor component.

History
Notepad++ was developed by Don Ho in September 2003. Ho first used JEXT (a Java-based text editor) at his company but, dissatisfied with its poor performance, he began to develop a text editor written in C++ with Scintilla. He developed it in his spare time since the idea was rejected by his company. Notepad++ was built as a Microsoft Windows application; the author considered, but rejected, the idea of using wxWidgets to port it to the Mac OS X and Unix platforms.

Notepad++ was first released on SourceForge on 25 November 2003, as a Windows-only application. It is based on the Scintilla editor component, and is written in C++ with only Win32 API calls using only the STL to increase performance and reduce program size.

In January 2010 the US government obliged US-based open source project hosts to deny access from Cuba, Iran, North Korea, Sudan, and Syria to comply with U.S. law. As a response to what the developer felt was a violation of the free and open-source software (FOSS) philosophy, in June 2010 Notepad++ moved out of US territorial jurisdiction by releasing a version on TuxFamily, in France. Some community services of Notepad++ (such as the forums and bug tracker) remained on SourceForge until 2015 when Notepad++ left SourceForge completely.

In 2011 Lifehacker described Notepad++ as "The Best Programming Text Editor for Windows", stating that "if you prefer a simple, lightweight, and extensible programming plain-text editor, our first choice is the free, open-source Notepad++". Lifehacker criticized its user interface, stating that "It is, in fact, fairly ugly. Luckily you can do a lot to customize its looks, and what it lacks in polish, it makes up for in functionality".

In 2014 Lifehacker readers voted Notepad++ as the "Most Popular Text Editor", with 40% of the 16,294 respondents specifying it as their most-loved editor. The Lifehacker team summarized the program as being "fast, flexible, feature-packed, and completely free".

In 2015 Stack Overflow conducted a worldwide Developer Survey, and Notepad++ was voted as the most used text editor worldwide with 34.7% of the 26,086 respondents claiming to use it daily. Stack Overflow noted that "The more things change, the more likely it is those things are written in JavaScript with NotePad++ on a Windows machine". The 2016 survey had Notepad++ at 35.6%.

In 2015, in response to the staff hijacking of projects hosted on SourceForge, Notepad++ left SourceForge completely with the forums being moved to NodeBB and the bug tracker to GitHub.

Features 
Notepad++ is a source code editor. It features syntax highlighting, code folding and limited autocompletion for programming, scripting, and markup languages, but not intelligent code completion or syntax checking. As such, it may properly highlight code written in a supported schema, but whether the syntax is internally sound or compilable, cannot be verified. As of version 7.6.3, Notepad++ can highlight the elements of 78 syntaxes:

ActionScript
Ada
ASN.1
ASP
Assembly
AutoIt
AviSynth scripts
BaanC
batch files
Blitz Basic
C
C#
C++
Caml
CMake
Cobol
CoffeeScript
Csound
CSS
D
Diff
Erlang
escript
Forth
Fortran
FreeBASIC
Gui4Cli
Haskell
HTML
INI files
Intel HEX
Inno Setup scripts
Java
JavaScript
JSON
JSP
KiXtart
LaTeX
LISP
Lua
Makefile
Matlab
MMIX
Nim
nnCron
NSIS scripts
Objective-C
OScript
Pascal
Perl
PHP
PostScript
PowerShell (Broken)
PureBasic
Python
R
Rebol
Registry script (.reg)
Resource file
Ruby
Rust
Scheme
Shell script
Smalltalk
SPICE
SQL
Swift
S-Record
Tcl
Tektronix HEX
TeX
txt2tags
Visual Basic
Visual Prolog
VHDL
Verilog
XML
YAML

The language list also displays two special-case items for ordinary plain text: "Normal text" (default)  or "MS-DOS Style", which tries to emulate DOS-era text editors.

Notepad++ has features for consuming and creating cross-platform plain text files. It recognizes three newline representations (and ) and can convert between them on the fly. In addition, it supports reinterpreting plain text files in various character encodings and can convert them to ASCII, UTF-8 or UCS-2. As such, it can fix plain text that seem gibberish only because their character encoding is not properly detected.

Notepad++ also has features that improve plain text editing experience in general, such as:
 Autosave
 Finding and replacing strings of text with regular expressions
 Searching text strings within opened tabs
 Searching text strings in a directory
 Guided indentation
 Line bookmarking
 Macros
 Simultaneous editing
 Split screen editing and synchronized scrolling
 Line operations, including sorting, case conversion (Uppercase, lowercase, camel case, sentence case), and removal of redundant whitespace
 Tabbed document interface

Plugins 
Notepad++ has support for macros and plugins, and has been remarked for its robust plugin architecture which enabled various new features to be integrated into the program. Currently, over 140 compatible plugins are developed for Notepad++, 10 of which are included by default in the program. The first plugin to be included in the program was "TextFX", which includes W3C validation for HTML and CSS, text sorting, character case alteration and quote handling.

Internationalization 
Notepad++ supports internationalization through XML files in an application-specific format containing all internationalized strings (dialog captions, menu titles and items, etc.) in a certain language; this file can be reloaded from the application settings. Translations to new languages can thus be written by simply editing an existing file.

Political messaging 
In March 2008, the "Boycott Beijing 2008" banner was placed on Notepad++'s SourceForge.net homepage. A few months later most users in China were unable to reach the SourceForge.net website from 26 June to 24 July 2008. This led to the widespread belief that China had banned SourceForge.net in retaliation for the Boycott banner.

In January 2015, the Notepad++ website was hacked by activists from the Fallaga Team who objected to an Easter egg endorsing Je suis Charlie. The Fallaga Team has been linked to ISIL and is also believed to be responsible for the 2017 hacking of websites of the British National Health Service.

In October 2019, Notepad++ released a version codenamed "Free Uyghur" (v7.8.1). In the release notice, the author expressed concern that hundreds of thousands of Uyghurs have been "subjected to political indoctrination, and sometimes even torture" in the Xinjiang Re-education Camp. He called for "additional pressure on the Chinese government to stop their oppressive actions and crimes concerning the Uyghur people". The software's dedicated site came under a distributed-denial-of-service attack and its GitHub issue page bombarded with nationalistic rhetoric, though it later recovered after being moved behind Cloudflare's anti-DDoS service.

In July 2020, Notepad++ released a version codenamed "Stand with Hong Kong" (v7.8.9). In the release notice, the author expressed his concern on the Chinese government implementation of the National Security Law in Hong Kong. In retaliation, Mainland Chinese browsers developed by Tencent (QQ Browser and WeChat’s built-in browser), Alibaba (UC Browser), 360 and Sogou started blocking the official site's "Download" page, but not other pages.

In early and mid-February 2022, Notepad++ released a version codenamed "Boycott Beijing 2022" (v8.3) and (v8.3.1).  In the release notice, the author expressed his concern on human rights in China, especially for Uyghurs and Hongkongers.  He suggest his audience "not watch or pay attention to the games".

In late February 2022, Notepad++ released a version codenamed "Declare variables, not war" (v8.3.2).  In the release notice, the author expressed his concern on the Russian invasion of Ukraine.  In March 2022, Notepad++ released a version codenamed "Make Apps, not war" (v8.3.3). The author continued to express his concern on the Russian invasion of Ukraine.

See also 

 List of text editors
 Comparison of text editors

Notes

References

External links 

 

2003 software
Free HTML editors
Software that uses Scintilla
Software using the GPL license
Windows text editors
Windows-only free software
Free text editors